Mukkha is the an archery sport. The game is played with a long arrow (ghashay) and a long bow (leenda). The arrow has a saucer shaped metallic plate (tubray) at its distal end. The archers play in teams and attempt to hit a small white wooden target called takai surrounded by a circular ring called kwaara. The target is secured in fresh clay placed at some height a few meters away from the archer.

Rules 
The game is played with a long arrow (ghashay) and a long bow (leenda). The arrow has a saucer shaped metallic plate (tubray) at its distal end. The archers play in teams and attempt to hit a small white wooden target called takai surrounded by a circular ring called kwaara. The target is secured in fresh clay placed at some height a few meters away from the archer. If the player manages to strike the targets they score a point. A successful attempt is usually celebrated by beating loud drums. On the other hand, if the player misses the target, the opposing team would celebrate instead.

History, name and origin 
The game is believed to be originated in the Baloristan regions of Pakistan.

Images

Further reading
‘Mukha’ lovers throng Topi contest. Dawn, 26 June 2012
Archery in traditional form popular in Pakistan villages. Wave Magazine, 10.01.2009
Mukha at

External links

Pashtun culture
Archery in Asia
Traditional sports of Pakistan
Archery in Pakistan
Sports originating in Pakistan
Culture of Khyber Pakhtunkhwa